In Greek mythology, Pheres (Ancient Greek: Φέρης, Phéres, modern pronunciation Féris; Latin: Pheres) may refer to the following individuals:

 Pheres, son of Cretheus and Tyro.
 Pheres, son of Jason and Medea.
 Pheres, also known as Phereus or Thyreus, a Calydonian prince as the son of King Oeneus and Althaea, daughter of King Thestius of Pleuron. He was the brother of Deianeira, Meleager, Toxeus, Clymenus, Periphas, Agelaus and Gorge. When the war between the Curetes and the Calydonians broke out, Pheres along with his brothers, including Meleager, all fell during the battle.
 Pheres, a Cretan killed by Aeneas in the Trojan War.
 Pheres, a companion of Aeneas in Italy. During the battle between the latter and Turnus, Pheres was killed by Halaesus.
 Pheres, a defender of Thebes

Notes

References 

 Antoninus Liberalis, The Metamorphoses of Antoninus Liberalis translated by Francis Celoria (Routledge 1992). Online version at the Topos Text Project.
 Apollodorus, The Library with an English Translation by Sir James George Frazer, F.B.A., F.R.S. in 2 Volumes, Cambridge, MA, Harvard University Press; London, William Heinemann Ltd. 1921. . Online version at the Perseus Digital Library. Greek text available from the same website.
Gaius Julius Hyginus, Fabulae from The Myths of Hyginus translated and edited by Mary Grant. University of Kansas Publications in Humanistic Studies. Online version at the Topos Text Project.
Hesiod, Catalogue of Women from Homeric Hymns, Epic Cycle, Homerica translated by Evelyn-White, H G. Loeb Classical Library Volume 57. London: William Heinemann, 1914. Online version at theio.com
Publius Papinius Statius, The Thebaid translated by John Henry Mozley. Loeb Classical Library Volumes. Cambridge, MA, Harvard University Press; London, William Heinemann Ltd. 1928. Online version at the Topos Text Project.
 Publius Papinius Statius, The Thebaid. Vol I-II. John Henry Mozley. London: William Heinemann; New York: G.P. Putnam's Sons. 1928. Latin text available at the Perseus Digital Library.
 Publius Vergilius Maro, Aeneid. Theodore C. Williams. trans. Boston. Houghton Mifflin Co. 1910. Online version at the Perseus Digital Library.
 Publius Vergilius Maro, Bucolics, Aeneid, and Georgics. J. B. Greenough. Boston. Ginn & Co. 1900. Latin text available at the Perseus Digital Library.
 Quintus Smyrnaeus, The Fall of Troy translated by Way. A. S. Loeb Classical Library Volume 19. London: William Heinemann, 1913. Online version at theio.com
 Quintus Smyrnaeus, The Fall of Troy. Arthur S. Way. London: William Heinemann; New York: G.P. Putnam's Sons. 1913. Greek text available at the Perseus Digital Library.

Characters in Greek mythology